Lo Wai may refer to:

 Lo Wei, sometimes spelled Lo Wai (1918–1996), a Hong Kong film actor and director
 Lo Wai (老圍), a walled village in Lung Yeuk Tau, Fanling, Hong Kong
 Lo Wai (老圍), a village in Tsuen Wan, Hong Kong